Alpinet Park, also known in the past as the Arboretum, is an urban park along the Bega River in Timișoara. Alpinet Park is one of the young parks of the city, being arranged in the 20th century.

Location 
The park is located in Elisabetin, on the left bank of the Bega River and extends between Trajan Bridge and Michael the Brave Bridge.

History 
The first arrangements were started in 1930–1934, on an area of 2.2 ha, by architect Mihai Demetrovici, the then director of the horticultural service of the city. Initially, the park was called Arboretum, then Alpinet. The name Alpinet is inspired by the uneven appearance of the land that created terraces with stone walls and by the variety of alpine and subalpine plants.

The park has undergone repeated improvements and changes over time. The current version belongs to architect Ștefan Iojică, made in 1967 on the occasion of a flower exhibition. In 2003 it was refitted by planting dozens of magnolias that replaced the specimens of pyramidal poplars on the river wall. Between 2017–2018, the park was rehabilitated and modernized on an area of 14,000 m2. The vegetation was diversified with new species of shrubs, trees and perennials, the alleys were rebuilt, the urban furniture and planters were changed and completed, and the lighting and irrigation systems were modernized.

References 

Parks in Timișoara
Parks established in 1934